The Cuba national futsal team is controlled by the Asociación de Fútbol de Cuba, the governing body for futsal in Cuba and represents the country in international futsal competitions, such as the World Cup and the CONCACAF Championships. They are one of the strongest teams in CONCACAF, has been reaching second place four times at the CONCACAF Futsal Championship and played 5 FIFA Futsal World Cup editions.

Tournaments

FIFA Futsal World Cup
 1989 - did not qualify
 1992 - did not qualify
 1996 - 1st round
 2000 - 1st round
 2004 - 1st round
 2008 - 1st round
 2012 - did not qualify
 2016 - 1st round
 2021 - did not qualify

CONCACAF Futsal Championship
 1996 -  2nd place
 2000 -  2nd place
 2004 -  2nd place
 2008 -  2nd place
 2012 - 5th place
 2016 - 4th place

Futsal at the Pan American Games
 2007 – 6th place

References

External links
Cuba at FIFA.com

Cuba
National sports teams of Cuba
Futsal in Cuba